Rob Fowler may refer to:

 Rob Fowler (meteorologist), chief meteorologist for WCBD-TV
 Rob Fowler (curler) (born 1975), Canadian curler